Jörgen Wännström (born January 29, 1969), is a retired ice hockey player who spent 12 seasons with Skellefteå AIK.

At the start of Jörgen's career he played 6 Elitserien games before Skellefteå was relegated to Allsvenskan in 1990. Wännström spent the last five seasons of his playing career with Burträsk HC in Division 2.

References

1969 births
Living people
Swedish ice hockey centres
Skellefteå AIK players